Grammatophyllum multiflorum or the multiflowered grammatophyllum, is a species of orchid endemic to the Philippines.

References

multiflorum
Orchids of the Philippines